The MP 59 (French : Métro sur Pneus d'appel d'offres de 1959) is a rubber tyred variant of electric multiple units used on the Paris Métro system, and is the oldest type still in regular passenger service. Manufactured by a consortium between CIMT-Lorraine (body), Jeumont-Schneider (control circuits), Alsthom and CEM (motors), they were first introduced in 1963 when the busiest routes of Lines 1 and 4 were converted to rubber tyred pneumatic operation. The trains circulated on Line 1 between 1963 and 2000, and Line 4 between 1967 and 2012. Today, 24 trains (originally from Line 1) operate on Line 11.

Conception

Following the success of the MP 55 rolling stock on Line 11, which saw a 5.5% increase in transport capacity, the RATP decided to study the expansion of rubber tyred rolling stock on other metro lines. The decision was made to first convert Line 1, due to it being the busiest line in the system. The decision to also equip Line 4 with rubber tyred stock soon followed. Fifty-two trains were ordered for Line 1 and roughly the same for Line 4.

Description
Although the MP 59 is very much identical to the MP 55 stock, there are several key differences; the first being more powerful motors ( compared to the  engines of the MP 55) and the second being a wide, one-piece windshield to allow operators an unblocked view of the tracks ahead. Various other mechanical improvements were made.

Initially, the trains on Line 1 had only 5 cars because the stations had not been able to accommodate 6-car trains at first. This changed in 1962/63 when the stations were lengthened, which after this time, a sixth car was added. All of the Line 4 platforms were already expanded prior to the arrival of the MP 59 stock and thus were able to accommodate 6-car trains when cascading began in 1967.

Each train was composed of 4 second-class cars, one first-class car, and one mixed. The first-class trains were painted in yellow, while the second-class segments were painted in a light-blue livery. Yellow bands could be found across the first-class cars and darker blue bands along the second-class cars. In 1980, the mixed cars were converted into second-class cars, which was achieved by removing the central partition.

Additional trains and refurbishment
In 1974, eight additional trains were ordered to improve service frequencies on both Lines 1 and 4, bringing the number of trains on each line to about 50 to 52. There was also an experimental train that was built during this time (called the MP 59DK) which contained many technological advances that were later adopted by the MF 77 and MP 89 stock. This particular train operated on Line 4 until 1979 and then operated on Line 1 until 1985, when it was refurbished and its experimental components replaced. The train was then circulated back into service either on Line 1 or Line 4.

Between 1986 and 1990, an experimental program ran on one MP 59 train that involved the installation of TV screens inside the train. The TVs would show various programs and advertisements. Certain stations along Lines 1 and 4 were also temporarily equipped with TV screens for the same experiment. Unfortunately, the program was largely unsuccessful and the TV monitors were dismantled in 1990. Shortly following, the experimental train was refurbished.

Between 1989 and 1992, the MP 59 stock was refurbished to prepare the Line 1 trains for the extension to La Defense. Most of the Line 4 stock were also refurbished. However, trains on Line 4 that were not suited for long-term operation (due to excessive wear and tear) were slated for early retirement. Unfortunately, this included the stock from 1974, which suffered greatly from mechanical defects.

For a short time, some of the refurbished trains on Line 1 featured an all-white livery with navy blue doors, as well as a uniquely renovated interior consisting of white-colored seating. However, the RATP quickly found that this livery was heavily conducive to vandalism and stopped renovating trains in this livery. In 1993, the RATP introduced its current mint green and white livery, by which all of the refurbished trains would be painted in.

Unlike the six-car configuration that the MP 59 possessed while in operation on Lines 1 and 4, the trains operate in four-car configurations along Line 11. Although all of the platforms are 75 meters in length, enough for a five-car train, the Victoria Depot (situated near Châtelet) is not large enough to accommodate five-car trains.

Exit from Line 1

In 1995, with the arrival of the MP 89 stock on Line 1, many MP 59 trains were either moved to other lines, or retired. 24 refurbished MP 59 cars were transferred to Line 11 to replace the aging MP 55 stock, which by the mid-1990s had reached the end of their useful lives. Other refurbished trains moved to Line 4 to replace unrefurbished trains that were being retired. Some of the unrefurbished MP 59 trains were retained by the RATP for use as spare parts for the Line 11 trains. Other renovated cars were stored as reserve stock for either Line 4 or Line 11. The remaining unrefurbished cars were retired.

One train (#047) was retired in 2007 after a fire broke out at the Simplon station on Line 4. Another train (#044) was also pulled from service, though the reasoning is unknown. This left only 48 trains left in operation on Line 4.

Exit from Line 4
With the arrival of the MP 05 automated stock on Line 1, the remaining 48 MP 59 trains on Line 4 were replaced by the MP 89 CC (just like their Line 1 counterparts were). The first MP 89CC train (#01) arrived on Line 4 in April, 2011 and went into service May 23, 2011. The first MP 59 train to be retired from service was #6049, which was pulled from service in April, 2011. #6021 was pulled from service on December 21, 2012 and was the last train to be retired.

It was originally speculated that some trains would be moved to Line 11 for reinforcement, but such plans never came to fruition. All of the trains in service on Line 4 have been scrapped, with spare parts to be salvaged for the remaining trains on Line 11.

Exit from Line 11

Île-de-France Mobilités will replace the last MP 59 trains on Line 11 (and the sole MP 73 unit on the line) with 39 MP 14 trains: the replacement MP 14 trains for Line 11 will be conductor-operated and five cars long.

Technical specifications
Train length: 
Overall width: 
Height of a train car above the running surface: 
Floor height above the running surface: 
Weight in running order: 
Maximum capacity (at four travelers / m2): 700 passengers including 144 seats
Folding seats available off-peak: 146
Maximum speed: 
Maximum power: 
Maximum braking normal steady state:

Other networks
 Montreal Metro had a forked version named MR-63
 Mexico City Metro has a forked version named MP-68
 Santiago Metro has a forked version named NS-74

References

The information in this article is based on that in its French equivalent

External links
 
 TRUCK (bogie)

Articles containing video clips
MP 1959
Alstom multiple units
Electric multiple units of France
750 V DC multiple units